Events from the year 1228 in Ireland.

Incumbent
Lord: Henry III

Deaths
 Henry de Loundres, an Anglo-Norman churchman who was Archbishop of Dublin, from 1213 to 1228.

References